Brian Kelley is an American television writer. He has written for SNL, Newsradio, Clerks, Futurama, Joey and The Simpsons.

Biography
Kelley graduated with honors from Connecticut's Darien High School, and in 1990 he entered Harvard University as a physics major. He became a television writer four years later.

Writing credits

The Simpsons episodes 
"Treehouse of Horror XIII" ("The Fright to Creep and Scare Harms") (Date November 3, 2002)
"A Star Is Born Again" (Date March 2, 2003)
"Margical History Tour" (Date February 8, 2004)
"Lisa the Drama Queen"  (Date January 25, 2009)
"Postcards from the Wedge" (Date March 14, 2010)
"Moms I'd Like to Forget"  (Date January 9, 2011)
"Treehouse of Horror XXIII" (With David Mandel) (Date October 7, 2012)
"Homer Goes to Prep School" (Date January 6, 2013)
"Specs and the City" (Date January 26, 2014)
"Brick Like Me" (Date May 4, 2014)
"The Princess Guide" (Date March 1, 2015)
"The Marge-ian Chronicles" (Date March 13, 2016)
"The Serfsons" (Date October 1, 2017)
"Lisa Gets the Blues" (With David Silverman) (Date April 22, 2018)
"101 Mitigations" (With Dan Vebber) (Date March 3, 2019)
"Woo-Hoo Dunnit?" (Date May 5, 2019)
"Livin' la Pura Vida" (Date November 17, 2019)
"Wad Goals" (Date February 21, 2021)
"The Longest Marge" (Date January 2, 2022)
"The Very Hungry Caterpillars" (Date April 30, 2023)

Futurama episodes 
"Love's Labours Lost in Space"

Awards and nominations

Notes

References

External links 

Living people
American television writers
American male television writers
Harvard University alumni
Year of birth missing (living people)
Writers Guild of America Award winners
Darien High School alumni